The Birmingham Cup is a greyhound racing competition inaugurated in 1939 and held annually at the Old Perry Barr Greyhound Stadium until the closure of the track in 1984. The competition was one of the leading events in the Midlands and was brought back in 1992 and was held at the new Perry Barr Stadium until the decision was made to discontinue the event in 2009. 

The event was held over the standard distance (the most common distance held at a track) and winners included the 1946 English Greyhound Derby champions Mondays News.  

In 2020 the competition was brought back in memory of Michael Lambe Senior.

Past winners

Venues and distances
1939-1979	Perry Barr (Walsall Rd)
1992-1997	Perry Barr (Aldridge Road, 500m)
1998-2021	Perry Barr (Aldridge Road, 480m)

Sponsors
1994-1998 Ansells Brewery
2005-2007 Tony Campbell On Course
2008-2008 Stan James Bookmakers
2009-2009 William Hill
2020-2021 M Lambe Construction

References

Greyhound racing competitions in the United Kingdom
Sports competitions in Birmingham, West Midlands
Recurring sporting events established in 1939
1939 establishments in England
Perry Barr